David Delaney Adams (born June 24, 1964) is a former American football running back in the National Football League (NFL) for the Dallas Cowboys and Los Angeles Rams. He also was a member of the Hamilton Tiger-Cats in the Canadian Football League (CFL). He was selected by the Indianapolis Colts in the twelfth round (309th overall) of the 1987 NFL Draft. He played college football at the University of Arizona.

Early years
Adams attended Sunnyside High School, where he played running back. As a junior, he led the state in yards per carry (12.6), yards per punt return (8.7) and yards per kickoff returns (38), while receiving All-state and All-city honors.

As a senior, he led the city in rushing, while receiving All-state, All-city and player of the year honors (by the Tucson Citizen). He was honorable-mention All-American and played in the North/South All Star Game. During his high school career his teams had a 22-3 overall record.

College career
Adams accepted a football scholarship from the University of Arizona. As a sophomore, he was named the starter, registering 188 carries for 750 yards and 6 touchdowns. As a junior, he was limited with injuries, posting 138 carries for 511 yards and 2 touchdowns.

As a senior, he was the first running back in school history to lead the Pac 10 in rushing (1,175 yards), which ranked fourth in school history. He finished his college career leading his team in rushing for three straight seasons, ranking third in school history in rushing yards (2,571) and second in rushing attempts (600).

Professional career

Indianapolis Colts
Adams was selected by the Indianapolis Colts in the 12th round (309th overall) of the 1987 NFL Draft, after dropping because he was seen too small to play professional football. He was released on September 8.

Dallas Cowboys
After the NFLPA strike was declared on the third week of the 1987 season, those contests were canceled (reducing the 16 game season to 15) and the NFL decided that the games would be played with replacement players. On September 23, Adams was signed to be a part of the Dallas Cowboys replacement team, that was given the mock name "Rhinestone Cowboys" by the media. He was a backup behind Alvin Blount and Tony Dorsett. Against the New York Jets, he had 5 carries for 43 yards, including a 27-yard touchdown run, and 2 kickoff returns for 23 yards. Against the Philadelphia Eagles, he tallied 2 carries for 6 yards and 3 kickoff returns for 70 yards. Against the Washington Redskins, he had one reception for 8 yards and one kickoff return for 20 yards. He was cut on October 20, at the end of the strike.

Los Angeles Rams
In 1987, he signed as a free agent with the Los Angeles Rams. He was released on December 17.

Los Angeles Raiders
In 1988, he signed as a free agent with the Los Angeles Raiders. He was released on August 1.

Hamilton Tiger-Cats
On April 13, 1989, he was signed by the Hamilton Tiger-Cats of the Canadian Football League. He appeared in one game, posting 3 carries for 2 yards. In 1990, he appeared in 3 games, tallying 19 carries for 65 yards and one touchdown.

Personal life
Adams is the uncle of basketball player Bryce Cotton.

References

External links 
 Pima County Sports Hall of Fame

1964 births
Living people
Players of American football from Tucson, Arizona
American football running backs
Canadian football running backs
Arizona Wildcats football players
Indianapolis Colts players
Dallas Cowboys players
Los Angeles Rams players
Hamilton Tiger-Cats players
Players of Canadian football from Arizona
National Football League replacement players